Constance de Castelbajac (1859–1886) was a French aristocrat and diarist. She served as the Marchioness of Castelbajac.

In her diary, she argued that Jewish women who converted to Christianity upon marrying remained Jewish. Furthermore, she disapproved of such inter-faith marriages. Professor Catherine Nicault of the University of Reims Champagne-Ardenne has argued that Castelbajac's views exemplified the way the French aristocracy was hostile towards Jews in the 19th century, who they viewed as parvenus.

Works

References

1859 births
1886 deaths
French diarists
Marchionesses
19th-century diarists